Proprioception refers to the sensory information relayed from muscles, tendons, and skin that allows for the perception of the body in space. This feedback allows for more fine control of movement. In the brain, proprioceptive integration occurs in the somatosensory cortex, and motor commands are generated in the motor cortex. In the spinal cord, sensory and motor signals are integrated and modulated by motor neuron pools called central pattern generators (CPGs). At the base level, sensory input is relayed by muscle spindles in the muscle and Golgi tendon organs (GTOs) in tendons, alongside cutaneous sensors in the skin.

Physiology

Central Pattern Generators 
Central pattern generators of groups of neurons in the spinal cord that are responsible for generating stereotyped movement. It has been shown that in cats, rhythmic activation patterns are still observed following removal of sensory afferents and removal of the brain., indicating that there is neural pattern generation in the spinal cord independent of descending signals from the brain and sensory information. It is currently understood that the spinal cord receives sensory input from proprioceptive organs and descending commands from the brain, integrates these signals, and sends activation signals to muscle through alpha motoneurons and fusimotor signals through gamma motoneurons in a coordinated and rhythmic fashion.

The Muscle Spindle 
The muscle spindle is a proprioceptive organ that lies embedded in the muscle. It consists of bag- and chain-type fibers, which correspond to dynamic and static responses, respectively. Spindles relay information through primary (Group Ia) and secondary (Group II) sensory afferents, with the primary afferent attached at the nucleus of the spindle and the secondary afferent attached at the end of the spindle. Spindles are conventionally thought of as encoding muscle length, velocity, and acceleration, however there is evidence to suggest that they respond to the force and yank (the first time-derivative of force) exerted on intrafusal muscle. Spindles are also composed of bag- and chain-type fibers, with dynamic and static stretch responses, respectively.

Key features of muscle spindle firing responses include initial bursts, history-dependence, and rate relaxation. Initial bursts occur at the onset of stretch and only last a very short time. History dependence refers to how the response of muscle spindles is affected by past stretch inputs. Rate relaxation refers to how the firing rate of muscle spindles decreases over time when held at a constant length.

Golgi Tendon Organ 
The Golgi tendon organ (GTO) is a proprioceptive organ that lies at the muscle-tendon junction. GTOs relay information through group Ib afferents, and encode active muscle force. As they are connected at one end to motor units, individual GTOs only relay information on a few fibers. At the same time, GTOs exhibit self-adaptation, in which GTO response decreases after prior activation, and cross-adaptation, in which GTO activity is modulated by prior activation of another GTO. Similar to muscle spindles, GTO firing is characterized by a heightened response at the onset of activity (dynamic response) and gradual relaxation to a resting firing rate (static response).

Fusimotor System 
While muscle spindles relay information via primary afferents, they receive descending efferent signals from the spinal cord via gamma motoneurons. This gamma innervation modulates the sensitivity of muscle spindle afferents to stretch. In cat studies, muscle spindle afferent firing rates with gamma fusimotor innervation were shown to be approximately equal to the sum of the gamma motoneuron firing rate and muscle spindle firing rate with no gamma innervation. In these same studies, gamma activity was shown to be correlated with joint angle during locomotion, indicating that fusimotor activity is periodically modulated during locomotion. Similar to muscle spindles, gamma motoneurons are also categorized according to static and dynamic response properties.

Motor control 
In motor control, proprioceptors provide critical feedback to the central nervous system. Muscle spindles relay information regarding muscle stretch, Golgi tendon organs relay information regarding tendon force, and gamma motoneurons modulate muscle spindle feedback. Afferent signals from spindles and tendon organs are integrated in the spinal cord, which then output muscle activation commands to muscle via alpha motoneurons. Because muscle spindles and tendon organs exhibit burst-like activity in response to rapid stretch, they play a vital role in reflexive perturbation responses. In a simulation study, it has been shown that the controllability of a limb in response to a perturbation is significantly increased when utilizing muscle spindle and tendon organ feedback in conjunction. However, proprioceptive feedback is also critical in controlling steady movements. In one study, de-afferented mice were unable to walk as quickly as the control group, and showed some reduced activity in extensor muscles.  It's also been shown in cats that disruption of feedback from muscle spindles impairs inter-joint coordination during ramp descent tasks. In a study on people with amputations, those with a higher degree of proprioceptive feedback from muscle spindles were able to better control the movement of a virtual limb.

Pathologies 
Proprioceptive feedback is also linked to motor deficits in Parkinson's disease and cerebral palsy. People with cerebral palsy often suffer from spasticity due to hyperreflexia. A common clinical test of spasticity is the pendulum test, in which the subject remains seated and the relaxed leg is dropped from horizontal. In individuals with spasticity, the leg comes to rest much more quickly due to increased reflexive muscle contraction.

Computational models have shown that results from pendulum tests in children with spastic cerebral palsy are explained by increased muscle tone, short-range stiffness, and increased stretch reflex responses due to increased muscle force feedback. Pendulum test results are also dependent on prior motion, indicating that muscle spindle feedback is a large component of spastic movement  due to the history-dependent behavior of muscle spindles. Increased proprioceptive feedback has also explained properties of gait in children with spastic cerebral palsy

In addition to functional impairments, proprioceptive deficits are linked to compensatory adaptations in the central nervous system. In the study on people with amputations mentioned previously, those with a lower degree of proprioception showed stronger connectivity between their visual and motor cortices, which is interpreted as a greater reliance on visual feedback to coordinate movement. Those with higher degrees of proprioception also showed higher connectivity between brain regions associated with sensorimotor feedback and sensory integration.

References 

Proprioception
Motor control